The abdominojugular test, also known as abdominojugular reflux (AJR), is a physical examination test useful in diagnosing right ventricle dysfunction, particularly right ventricular failure.

AJR is a test for measuring jugular venous pressure (JVP) through the distention of the internal jugular vein. A positive AJR test correlates with the pulmonary artery pressure and thus is a marker for right heart dysfunction, specifically right ventricular failure.

Reflux in this context means backup of the circulatory system and is not to be confused with reflex.


Procedure
The patient is asked to lie down at 30 degrees with his/her head tilted 45 degrees to the left. Then an oblique light is used to illuminate the jugular region of the neck to help in identifying the internal jugular vein. Care must be taken not to confuse it with the external jugular, whose beating is more easily seen under the skin due to it being more superficial. In patients with severe right heart congestion, observation of the internal jugular might not be feasible due to its distention all the way into the upper neck and skull.

The clinician presses firmly over either the right upper quadrant of the abdomen (i.e., over the liver) or over the center of the abdomen  for 10 seconds with a pressure of 20 to 35 mm Hg while observing the swelling of the internal jugular vein in the neck and also observing to be sure the patient does not perform a Valsalva maneuver.

On an otherwise healthy individual, the jugular venous pressure remains constant or temporarily rises for a heartbeat or two, before returning to normal. This negative result would be indicated by a lack of swelling of the jugular vein. Negative abdominojugular reflux is seen in Budd-Chiari syndrome.

A positive result is variously defined as either a sustained rise in the JVP of at least 3 cm or more  or a fall of 4 cm or more  after the examiner releases pressure. The AJR has a reported sensitivity of 24%  to 72%  and a specificity of 93% to 96%. The large discrepancy in sensitivity may be explained by the higher value being reported during performance in optimal conditions of a cardiac lab while the lower value was from a study in an emergency department.

References

Physical examination
Medical signs
Cardiology